Saya Gyi U Ba Lwin born in Rangoon, Burma on 20 September 1892, was a famous headmaster of Myoma National School from 1924 to 1953 after Ngwe Zin and Pho Latt.

Pho Latt and Rangoon University boycotters founded Myoma National High School in 1920.

He was also a Fellow of the Royal Geographical Society.

References 

1892 births
1968 deaths
Burmese Theravada Buddhists
University of Yangon alumni
Burmese educators
People from Yangon
Fellows of the Royal Geographical Society